In physics, resistive force is a force, or the vector sum of numerous forces, whose direction is opposite to the motion of a body, and may refer to:

 Friction, during sliding and/or rolling
 Drag (physics), during movement through a fluid (see fluid dynamics)
 Normal force, exerted reactionally back on the acting body by the compressive, tensile or shear stress within the recipient body
 Intermolecular forces, when separating adhesively bonded surfaces
 Magnetic repulsion, when a magnetic object moves against another magnetic field
 Gravity, during vertical takeoff
 Mechanical load, in a simple machine